Diāna Dadzīte (born 4 February 1986) is a Latvian track and field athlete competing in javelin throw.

Dadzīte participated at the 2016 Summer Paralympics in Rio de Janeiro, where she was flag bearer of the Latvian team at the opening ceremony. At the F55/F56 javelin throw competition she became Paralympic champion with a new world record throw of 23.26 meters. She competed at the 2020 Summer Paralympics, in Women's javelin throw F56, winning a bronze medal, and in Women's discus throw F55, winning a silver medal.

She competed at the 2017 World Championship, in shot put F55, discus F55 and javelin F56, winning three gold medals.

References

External links 

 Grossetto 2016 profile at Paralympic.org
 

1986 births
Living people
Paralympic athletes of Latvia
Paralympic gold medalists for Latvia
Paralympic silver medalists for Latvia
World record holders in Paralympic athletics
Latvian female javelin throwers
Latvian female discus throwers
World Para Athletics Championships winners
Paralympic medalists in athletics (track and field)
Athletes (track and field) at the 2016 Summer Paralympics
Athletes (track and field) at the 2020 Summer Paralympics
Medalists at the 2016 Summer Paralympics
Medalists at the 2020 Summer Paralympics
Wheelchair javelin throwers
Wheelchair discus throwers
Paralympic javelin throwers
Paralympic discus throwers